Andrijevica (Montenegrin Cyrillic: Андријевица) is a town and the seat of Andrijevica Municipality in eastern Montenegro. According to the 2011 census, it has a population of 1,048.

History
The town of Andrijevica is a relatively new settlement, as its first rudiments begin in the middle of the nineteenth century. However, the territory the municipality is for a long time the area of human activity and space with numerous settlements that appeared and disappeared during the history.

Archaeological research of the Institute for monuments protection from Cetinje in 1956, it was discovered that traces of materialculture from Neolithic period exist in Berane valley. In addition, traces of the Illyrian culture were found also, so it can be assumed that the environment of Andrijevica was ecumenical space of numerous groups of people. Remainders of Roman settlements are also present in Berane valley, as well as in the vicinity of Andrijevica town.

During the Middle ages, the fort of Grace existed, 1 km from today's town of Andrijevica. The fort was probably guarding the road along the Lim River, which was part of the main road network between the regions of Raška and Zeta. This period saw emergence of a number of smaller villages and settlements, all of which predate the Andrijevica town.

During the rule of House of Nemanjić, it was noted that the area of Andrijevica was densely populated with Orthodox Christian population. In the Nemanjić era, the center of the area was Budim grad, some 15 km from today's town. A descendant of the Nemanjić house, Andrija, built a church called Andrijevina, which was razed by the Ottomans in 1765.

In nineteenth century, the warrior tribe of Vasojevići, which was frequently rebelling against Ottoman rule, began forming a settlement around the new church of Andrijevina, which will eventually become Andrijevica. In 1858, Vasojević Duke Miljan Vukov proclaims Vasojevići region a part of Montenegro.

From that point, the settlement gradually expands into town, but World War I interrupt its development. Andrijevica was center of the county (Okrug) from the 1918 to 1921, and the inter-war period was a time of rapid development for the town.

In July 1944, the German SS Skanderbeg division massacred more than 400 Orthodox Christian civilians in the town. After World War II, the town was first the seat of the district (srez), and then of municipality (opština) until 1960. Andrijevica was restored with municipality status in 1991.

The economy of Andrijevica was struck heavily by the decline of industry during the Yugoslav Wars, hence the population of municipality declined slowly but steadily.

Demographics
According to the 2011 census, Andrijevica had 1,048 inhabitants.

Sports
The local football team is FK Komovi, who have spent recent seasons in the country's third tier. They play their home games at the Stadion Prljanije. The town's handball team is RK Komovi.

Transport

Andrijevica is connected with rest of Montenegro by two-laned motorways. Andrijevica is on the corridor of the future Bar-Boljare motorway.

Tourism

Andrijevica is surrounded by the mountains of Komovi, Bjelasica and Prokletije, situated on a terrace 40m above river Lim. Tourist activities in the area includes mountaineering (alpinism, hiking), biking, rafting, sports (soccer, basketball), fishing, etc. Main tourist attraction is mountain Komovi (2461 m). This mountain can be accessed by a car in less than 45 minutes, by the mountainous Andrijevica - Mateševo road.

Notes

References

External links
 Official site

Populated places in Andrijevica Municipality
Accursed Mountains
Serb communities in Montenegro